The IAG Guardian is a United Arab Emirates-made armored vehicle. It was developed by the International Armored Group company. It's available in 4x4 and 6x6 configurations. This vehicle has been used in the Middle East conflict and has been marked as battle proven to participate in low intensity conflicts.

Design
Guardians are able to withstand projectile fired from high level ballistic and blast resistance. Equipped with diesel V8 turbo 6.7 L engine that produces 300 HP or engine type 6.8L V10, this machine produced 352 HP power with 5 or 6 speed automatic transmission. Guardian can speed up to 120 km per hour on smooth with the range up to 800 km.

For the protection aspect, the Guardian is designed with standard ballistic protection up to CEN Level B6 or STANAG level II. But with an add-on armor package, Guardian protection can be upgraded to CEN Level B7 or STANAG level III. Additional protection can be removed to reduce the weight of the vehicle, such as to facilitate maneuvering the vehicle while crossing the off-road terrain. In principle, the Guardian provides 360 degree protection to its crew, including the implementation of 3 point door locking to provide extra protection in the face of explosive effects.

The Guardian is also able to withstand a 6 kg TNT effect that explodes under the vehicle.

Variants

Guardian 4x4 Basic variant for low intensity conflict in two axle configuration. Can carry a total of 10 personnel, including driver/commander.

Guardian 4x4 Xtreme An upgraded variant with add-on armor and cage armor to increase the protection level. The level of protection increased to STANAG Level III.

Guardian 6x6 New configuration with better protection in three axle configuration. Can carry a total of 12 personnel, including driver/commander.

Combat history

The IAG Guardian was used by Kurdish Military Forces in Iraq and the Syrian Democratic Forces in Syria, it showed combat capabilities by protecting soldiers in operations.

The IAG Guardian is also operated by the Malaysian Armed Forces for its peacekeeping mission in Lebanon under the United Nations (UN) flag.

Operators

 : In police service.
 : 45 Guardian Xtreme MRAPs delivered in December 2021 for Bulgarian special forces. They were built locally at the SAMARM 90 factory.
 : In Public Security Service.
 : 12 Guardian 4x4 Xtreme in service with Malaysian Army.
 : The Nigerien Army received IAG Guardians courtesy of German assistance.
 : In police service.

Non-state actors
  Syrian Democratic Forces
  Peshmerga

References

Military vehicles of the United Arab Emirates